26th BSFC Awards
December 11, 2005

Best Film: 
 Brokeback Mountain 
The 26th Boston Society of Film Critics Awards, honoring the best in filmmaking in 2005, were given on 11 December 2005. This year's awards are dedicated to the memory of Robin Dougherty, a former Boston Phoenix film critic who died this summer.

Winners

Best Film:
Brokeback Mountain
Runner-up: Munich
Best Actor:
Philip Seymour Hoffman – Capote
Runner-up: Heath Ledger – Brokeback Mountain
Best Actress:
Reese Witherspoon – Walk the Line
Runner-up: Keira Knightley – Pride & Prejudice
Best Supporting Actor:
Paul Giamatti – Cinderella Man
Runner-up: Oliver Platt – Casanova and The Ice Harvest
Best Supporting Actress:
Catherine Keener – Capote, The 40-Year-Old Virgin and The Ballad of Jack and Rose
Best Director:
Ang Lee – Brokeback Mountain
Runner-up: Steven Spielberg – Munich
Best Screenplay:
Dan Futterman – Capote
Runner-up: Tony Kushner and Eric Roth – Munich
Best Cinematography:
Robert Elswit – Good Night, and Good Luck.
Runner-up: Rodrigo Prieto – Brokeback Mountain
Best Documentary:
Murderball
Runner-up: Grizzly Man
Best Foreign-Language Film:
Kung Fu Hustle (Kung fu) • Hong Kong/China
Runner-up: 2046 • Hong Kong
Best New Filmmaker:
Joe Wright – Pride & Prejudice
Runner-up: Paul Haggis – Crash
Best Ensemble Cast:
Syriana
Runner-up: Crash

External links
Past Winners

References
Boston critics name 'Brokeback' best film Boston Globe
Boston film crix hail 'Brokeback,' 'Capote' Variety

2005
2005 film awards
2005 awards in the United States
2005 in Boston
December 2005 events in the United States